Plan de Guadalupe International Airport, also known as Saltillo Airport, is an airport located at Ramos Arizpe in the state of Coahuila in Mexico. It serves the metropolitan area of Saltillo–Ramos Arizpe, also served by nearby Monterrey's Monterrey International Airport and Del Norte International Airport.

The international category was given back in 1987, when the runway was expanded to receive aircraft such as the Boeing 757, and the new terminal was opened with four boarding gates, a modern ticketing area, customs, migration, baggage claim areas, and a cafeteria.

On November 21, 2017, Aeroméxico Connect ended its single commercial service to Mexico City, but they returned on January 15, 2018. The flight to Mexico City was cancelled again from November 29, 2019.

Facilities

It handled 4,665 passengers in 2021, and 3,593 passengers in 2020 according to Administradora Coahuilense de Infraestructura y Transporte Aéreo.

Airlines and destinations

Cargo

Accidents
On July 6, 2008, USA Jet Airlines flight 199, a McDonnell Douglas DC-9-15, crashed at 2:15 a.m. as the freighter approached the airport. The flight originated in Hamilton, Ontario, and stopped in Shreveport, Louisiana, en route to Saltillo.  The crash killed the pilot and injured the co-pilot, who suffered severe burns.

On September 15, 2022, an Aeronaves TSM Fairchild Swearingen Metroliner XA-UMW took off from Runway 15 at Saltillo, climbed to approximately 800 feet AGL an experienced an engine failure and extreme vibrations from the right hand engine. The aircraft subsequently made a forced landing 2.4nm north of the airport. The flight-crew were taken to hospital for a checkup but were promptly discharged. The aircraft received substantial damage.

See also 

 List of the busiest airports in Mexico

References

External links
 MMIO at Fallingrain
 MMIO at Elite Jets
 MMIO pic at Our Airports

Airports in Coahuila
Saltillo